was the third shōgun of the Ashikaga shogunate, ruling from 1368 to 1394 during the Muromachi period of Japan. Yoshimitsu was Ashikaga Yoshiakira's third son but the oldest son to survive, his childhood name being Haruō. Yoshimitsu was appointed shōgun, a hereditary title as head of the military estate, in 1368 at the age of ten; at twenty he was admitted to the imperial court as Acting Grand Counselor (Gon Dainagon ). 

In 1379, Yoshimitsu reorganized the institutional framework of the Gozan Zen  establishment before, two years later, becoming the first person of the warrior (samurai) class to host a reigning emperor at his private residence. In 1392, he negotiated the end of the Nanboku-chō imperial schism that had plagued politics for over half a century. Two years later he became Grand Chancellor of State (Dajō daijin ), the highest-ranking member of the imperial court. 

Retiring from that and all public offices in 1395, Yoshimitsu took the tonsure and moved into his Kitayama-dono retirement villa which, among other things, boasted a pavilion two-thirds covered in gold leaf (Kinkaku shariden ). There, he received envoys from the Ming and Joseon courts on at least six occasions and forged the terms of a Sino-Japanese trade agreement that endured for over a century. In recognition for his diplomatic efforts (and overt displays of subservience), the Chinese sovereign pronounced Yoshimitsu "King of Japan" (Nihon kokuō ). 

In 1407, he set into motion a plan to become "Dajō tenno", a title customarily applied to a retired emperor. Although unrealized due to his sudden death the following year, this last venture was particularly audacious because Yoshimitsu never actually sat on the Japanese throne. Late in his career, it appears Yoshimitsu sought to legitimize his transcendent authority through the idiom of Buddhist kingship, deploying ritual, symbols, and monumentalism to cast him as a universal monarch or dharma king, not unlike his counterparts in Southeast Asia. His posthumous name was Rokuon'in.

Biography
In 1368 Yoshimitsu was appointed shōgun; at the same time Emperor Chōkei ascends the southern throne. In the following year, the Southern Court samurai Kusunoki Masanori who was under the employ of the emperor defects to the Ashikaga bakufu (but would later defect again to royalist forces under Emperor Kameyama in 1380). However, Kusunoki was defeated in 1390.

While in 1370, the renowned commander Imagawa Sadayo was sent to subdue Kyushu; the region would later be pacified by 1389, which leads to Yoshimitsu distributing lands there. There was an uprising in Kyushu but this was later suppressed in 1397 (another uprising in Mutsu was suppressed in 1402).

The southern army suffers reverses in 1380 but enjoys a resurgence in 1382. The Koga Domain, a region of the Southern army is defeated in 1385.

In 1392, the Northern and Southern courts are reconciled under Emperor Go-Komatsu. Yoshimitsu officially cedes his position to his son Ashikaga Yoshimochi in 1394 who is appointed the new shōgun. The Muromachi administration was later organized in 1398. Although Yoshimitsu retired in 1394, the old shōgun did not abandon any of his powers. Yoshimitsu continued to maintain authority over the shogunate until his death. Yoshimitsu is recognized as Nippon Koku-Ō (King of Japan) by Yongle Emperor in 1404.

Yoshimitsu died suddenly in 1408 at age 50.  After his death, his retirement villa (near Kyoto) became Rokuon-ji, which today is famous for its three-storied, gold-leaf covered reliquary known as "Kinkaku". So famous is this single structure, in fact, that the entire temple itself is often identified as the Kinkaku-ji, the Temple of the Golden Pavilion.  A statue of Yoshimitsu is found there today.

Contributions
Yoshimitsu resolved the rift between the Northern and Southern Courts in 1392, when he persuaded Go-Kameyama of the Southern Court to hand over the Imperial Regalia to Emperor Go-Komatsu of the Northern Court.  Yoshimitsu's greatest political achievement was that he managed to bring about the end to constant fighting during the Nanboku-chō period. This event had the effect of firmly establishing the authority of the Muromachi shogunate and suppressing the power of the regional daimyōs who might challenge central authority.

Concordant with increased communication between the Muromachi Shogunate and the Ming Dynasty in what is now China, during this period Japan received a significant influx of Ming influence to its economic system, architecture, philosophy and religion, and writing. The embassies of Japan and China encountered communications between 1373–1406.

Yoshimitsu commissions the Muromachi palace in Kyoto's elite district of Kamigyo in 1378, on the site of the former residence of the nobleman Saionji Sanekane.

He also played a major role in the genesis of Noh theatre, as the patron and lover of Zeami Motokiyo, the actor considered to be Noh's founder, whom Yoshimitsu encouraged to give a loftier treatment to his art.

The Ashikaga shogunate and the corresponding time period are often referred to as the Muromachi shogunate or the Muromachi period in Japanese historiography because Yoshimitsu constructed his residential headquarters along the Muromachi Road in the northern part of Kyoto in 1378.

Family
 Father: Ashikaga Yoshiakira
 Mother: Ki no Yoshiko (1336–1413)
 Wife: Hino Nariko (1351–1405)
 Concubines:
 Ichijo no Tsubone
 Hino Yasuko (1369–1419)
 Fujiwara no Yoshiko (1358–1399)
 Kaga no Tsubone (d. 1422)
 Kasuga no Tsubone
 Nefu'in (1370–1421)
 Fujiwara no Kyoko (1369–1406)
 Fujiwara no Tomoko (d. 1426)
 Keijun'in
 Takahashi-dono (d. 1429)
 Ikegami-dono (d. 1426)
 Children:
 a daughter by Nariko
 Ashikaga Yoshimochi by Yoshiko
 Ashikaga Yoshinori by Yoshiko
 Ashikaga Yoshitsugu (1394–1418) by Kasuga
 Daijiin Seishou (1395–1433) by Nefu'in
 Gisho (1406–1467) by Tomoko
 Irie Juzen (1397–1415) by Yoshiko
 Sonman by Kaga
 Hodo (1385–1387) by Kaga
 a boy (1394–1436) by Kyoko
 Daijin'in Sei (1396–1453) by Kyoko
 a daughter married Rokkaku Mitsutsuna
 Kaji Yoshiaki (1406–1467) by Tomoko
 Koshoin by Keijun'in
 a daughter by Ikegami
 Kozan Eiryu (1403–1442) by Ikegami

Eras of Yoshimitsu's bakufu
The years in which Yoshimitsu was shōgun are more specifically identified by more than one era name or nengō.

Nanboku-chō southern court
Eras as reckoned by legitimate Court (as determined by Meiji rescript):
 Shōhei  (1346–1370)
 Kentoku        (1370–1372)
 Bunchū  (1372–1375)
 Tenju          (1375–1381)
 Kōwa           (1381–1384)
 Genchū  (1384–1393)
Nanboku-chō northern court
Eras as reckoned by pretender Court (as determined by Meiji rescript):
 Ōan            (1368–1375)
 Eiwa           (1375–1379)
 Kōryaku        (1379–1381)
 Eitoku         (1381–1384)
 Shitoku        (1384–1387)
 Kakei          (1387–1389)
 Kōō            (1389–1390)
 Meitoku        (1390–1393)‡
Post-Nanboku-chō reunified court
Eras merged as Meitoku 3 replaced Genchū 9 as Go-Kameyama abdicated.
 Meitoku        (1393–1394)‡
 Ōei            (1394–1428)

References

Sources
 Ackroyd, Joyce I. (1982) Lessons from History: the Tokushi Yoron. Brisbane: University of Queensland Press.  ;  OCLC 7574544
 Morton, W. Scott and J. Kenneth Olenik. (1973). Japan: Its History and Culture. Newton Abbot, Devon: David & Charles. ; OCLC 462186835
 Pier, Garrett Chatfield. (1914).   Temple Treasures of Japan. New York: Frederick Fairchild Sherman. OCLC 535337
 Stavros, Matthew, and Norika Kurioka. "Imperial Progress to the Muromachi Palace, 1381 A Study and Annotated Translation of Sakayuku Hana". Japan Review 28 (2015): 3–46. https://www.jstor.org/stable/43684115
 Stavros, Matthew (December 2017). "Monuments and Mandalas in Medieval Kyoto: Reading Buddhist Kingship in the Urban Plan of Ashikaga Yoshimitsu". Harvard Journal of Asiatic Studies. 77: 321–361
 Titsingh, Isaac. (1834). Nihon Ōdai Ichiran; ou,  Annales des empereurs du Japon.  Paris: Royal Asiatic Society, Oriental Translation Fund of Great Britain and Ireland. OCLC 585069
 Turnbull, Stephen. (2005). Samurai Commanders. Oxford: Osprey Press. ; ;  OCLC 60834971
 Worden, Robert L. (1994). "Kamakura and Muromachi Periods, 1185–1573; Economic and Cultural Developments", A Country Study: Japan. Washington, D.C.: Federal Research Division, Library of Congress.

External links 

1358 births
1408 deaths
14th-century Buddhist nuns
15th-century Buddhist nuns
Muromachi period Buddhist clergy
Japanese Buddhist clergy
14th-century Japanese people
15th-century Japanese people
14th-century shōguns
Yoshimitsu
Yoshimitsu
Rinzai Buddhists
LGBT royalty
Medieval LGBT people